Netherlands East Indies Forces Intelligence Service (NEFIS)  was a Dutch World War II-era intelligence and special operations unit operating mainly in the Japanese-occupied Netherlands East Indies (now Indonesia).

Soon after the evacuation from the Dutch East Indies, a Dutch intelligence service was set up in Australia on the instructions of the Dutch Commander of the forces in the East, Conrad Helfrich.

NEFIS I gathered reports, maps, publications and photos on the Dutch East Indies. On the basis of this information, monthly summaries were issued on the situation in the archipelago.

NEFIS II was responsible for censoring the mail of Royal Netherlands Navy and Royal Netherlands East Indies Army (KNIL) personnel. It also checked whether the spouses of Dutch troops in Australia presented a security risk. It was not involved in carrying out secret intelligence operations. That was the task of the Inter-Allied Services Department (ISD), which was set up in April 1942 on the instructions of US General Douglas MacArthur, and was responsible for sending out agents to commit sabotage and gather intelligence in occupied areas. Two Dutch officers were assigned to the Dutch East Indies section, which, like NEFIS, was based in Melbourne.

A few months later, on 6 July 1942, the Inter-Allied Services Department was merged with other intelligence services operating from Australia. The new service was called the Allied Intelligence Bureau (AIB). It included a division responsible for gathering information on the enemy and carrying out sabotage operations. The Dutch section of the former ISD was incorporated into this division. The Dutch section carried out various operations in enemy territory. NEFIS was not given the task of sending agents on assignments until after the AIB had been reorganised in April 1943.

A new division, NEFIS III, was created for this purpose in May 1943. It sent secret agents into occupied territory by submarine or plane to gather intelligence on the local political and military situation. If possible, these agents had to make contact with the local population to gather information and set up undercover organisations.
  
NEFIS III had little success with the deployment of secret agents. Despite the training course, the agents lacked experience and expertise. It was also difficult to win support from the local population in the Dutch East Indies, as they feared Japanese reprisals. NEFIS III, and its predecessor, the Dutch section of the ISD, sent 36 teams into enemy territory. Over 250 agents were involved in these operations, and 39 lost their lives.

See also
Operation Tiger, landing party on Java - captured and executed almost to a man
Operation Walnut, landing party on the Aroe Islands
Operation Whiting, landing party on Dutch New Guinea
Operation Oaktree, operation in central Dutch New Guinea

References

 Official History of Special Operations Australia Volume 1 - Organisation Copy 1
Allies in adversity, Australia and the Dutch in the Pacific War
 Special Operations Australia From which most of the above text was used with permission
 Soldaten Van Oranje 

Dutch East Indies
Intelligence services of World War II
Japanese occupation of the Dutch East Indies
Military intelligence agencies
Dutch intelligence agencies